DWGV (99.1 FM), broadcasting as GV 99.1, is a radio station owned and operated by GV Radios Network Corporation, a subsidiary of Apollo Broadcast Investors, affiliated of Radyo5 Manila. The station's studio is located at the 4th Floor, PG Building, McArthur Highway, Balibago, Angeles City, and its transmitter is located at the Royal Golf And Country Club, Porac. It operates daily from 5:00 AM to 12:00 MN.

History

DWGV-FM signed on November 7, 1983, by GV Broadcasting System under the foundation of Emmanuel "Manoling" Galang, a licensed Electronics and Communications Engineer. Originally intended as a training background for the students of Galang Technical Institute, it later became Angeles City's center of information for Central Luzon. GV also produced programs for most prominent personalities such as Ted Failon, Erwin Tulfo, and Daniel Razon among others.

GV's broadcast franchise under Republic Act 8169 was granted in 1995, and was later amended in 1998 allowing GV expanded its broadcast operations nationwide. A second GV station (DZGV) was launched in Galang's native hometown province Batangas, followed by an AM station (GVAM 792) Angeles. Other stations were applied and approved by NTC.

Until then, the GV FM 99.1 brand and its "Drive Radio" tagline were used until 2012 when the "FM" suffix was dropped and rechristened as GV 99.1 with a new slogan "Your Good Vibes".

In 2007, GV Broadcasting was acquired by MediaQuest Holdings, Inc., a media conglomerate owned by the PLDT's Beneficial Trust Fund, with the Galangs became part of the said firm. Since then, GV Broadcasting was renamed as Mediascape Inc. GV 99.1 became available nationwide on Mediascape's own DTH satellite service Cignal TV since its launch in 2009.

In 2009, management and operations of GV radio stations were transferred to a new entity Metro City Media Services (MCMS) before merging with cable TV operations of Apollo Global Corporation and became Apollo Broadcast Investors.

Awards

References

Radio stations in Angeles City
Radio stations established in 1983
Contemporary hit radio stations in the Philippines